Arcuatopterus is a genus of flowering plant in the Apiaceae, with five species. It is native from the Himalayas to south-central China.

References 

Apioideae
Apioideae genera